Peach Orchard is an unincorporated community in northwest Pemiscot County, Missouri, United States. It is located on Route 153, approximately twenty miles northwest of Caruthersville.

A post office called Peach Orchard was established in 1936, and remained in operation until 1973. The community was named after a peach orchard near the original town site.

References

Unincorporated communities in Pemiscot County, Missouri
Unincorporated communities in Missouri